The 2002 Austrian Figure Skating Championships took place between 8 and 9 December 2001. Skaters competed in the disciplines of men's singles, ladies' singles, and ice dancing. The results were used to choose the Austrian teams to the 2002 Winter Olympics, the 2002 World Championships, and the 2002 European Championships.

Senior results

Men

Ladies

Ice dancing

External links
 results

Austrian Figure Skating Championships
2001 in figure skating
Austrian Figure Skating Championships, 2002
Figure skating